Fatbardh Deliallisi (5 April 1932 – 15 October 2011) is a former football player who played for the Albania national team.

International career
He made his debut for Albania in a September 1957 friendly match  against China and earned a total of 12 caps, scoring no goals. His final international was a May 1965 FIFA World Cup qualification match against Northern Ireland.

Honours
Albanian Superliga: 7
 1954, 1957, 1958, 1959, 1961, 1963, 1964

References

External links

1932 births
2011 deaths
Association football defenders
Albanian footballers
Albania international footballers
KF Erzeni players
FK Partizani Tirana players